The 2012 St. Norbert Green Knights football team represented St. Norbert College as a member of the Midwest Conference (MWC) during the 2012 NCAA Division III football season. They were led by 14th-year head coach Jim Purtill and play their home games at Schneider Stadium in De Pere, Wisconsin.

On August 31, St. Norbert played their season opener against  at Donnybrook Stadium in Dublin, Ireland. The game was played as part of the 2012 Global Ireland Football Tournament. It marked the first time in 20 years that an NCAA Division III regular season football game was played in Europe.

Schedule

References

St. Norbert
St. Norbert Green Knights football seasons
St. Norbert Green Knights football